Ken Johnson, better known as "Pinto Ron", (born 1957) is a Buffalo Bills superfan known for attending every single Bills home and away game and hosting a tailgate party from 1994 to 2020, even attending the 2015 Bills–Jaguars game in London. A software engineer by day, Johnson is known for his red Ford Pinto and antics cooking food on his car hood in a variety of objects such as a shovel and army helmet; furthermore, he holds a tradition of being doused in ketchup and mustard. Most notably he served shots out of a bowling ball until he was forced to shut down by the National Football League. Johnson moved his tailgate party to private property next to the stadium where the NFL has no jurisdiction and was able to resume serving bowling ball shots. He has been featured in multiple NFL Films, as well as the made-for-TV movie Second String. His streak of 423 games attended over 26 years ended in September 2020, as the games were played without spectators due to the COVID-19 pandemic. In 2021 with fans being allowed to return to games he resumed his Pinto tailgate. On September 19, 2022, Pinto Ron was featured on Monday Night Football with Bills Superfan Joel Sovie.

References 

Buffalo Bills
Living people
Spectators of American football
1958 births
People from Rochester, New York
American software engineers